Alexander Ivashkevich (alternately spelled as Aleksandr Ivaškevitš in Estonia, and as Aleksander Ivashkevich) (born April 27, 1960) is a professional theater and movie actor and a tap dancer.

Biography

Education 

 1978–1982 – Kharkiv State School of Art (cinema and theater acting, stage movement, singing, dancing and fencing). Kharkov, Ukraine.
 1993 – Woodpeckers Tap Dance Center. New York, USA.
 1996–1997 – Broadway Dance Center. New York, USA.

Theater 

 1980–1982 – The Russian Theater in Kharkov, Ukraine (actor).
 1982–1983 – The National Theater in Kharkov, Ukraine (actor).
 1983–1984 – The Latvian Baltic Fleet Theater in Liepāja, Latvia (actor).
 1984–1985 – The Kaliningrad Theater in Kaliningrad, Russia (actor).
 Starting from 1985 – The Russian Theater in Tallinn, Estonia (actor).

Works

Parts in the theater 
Key roles through the years:
 1986 — A Midsummer Night's Dream, by W. Shakespeare – Oberon and Lysander
 1987 — Trap №46, height 2“ by Y. Schekochihin, director A. Tsukerman
 1989 — Controversum by Pierre de Marivaux, director R. Polak - Azor
 1991 — Ciao Rudi musical by P. Garinei and S. Giovannini, director M. Moreydo - Rudolfo
 1993 — Butterflies Are Free by L. Gershe, director V. Filonov — Don Baker
 1997 — The Hobgoblin by E. Wilde, director Ago-Endrik Kerge – Tiit Piibeleht
 1997 — The vagaries of Marianne by A. De Musset, director S. Cherkasski – Octave
 1998 — Sunset Boulevard by V. Denissov, director R. Viktyuk – Joe
 1999 — The Taming of the Shrew by W. Shakespeare, J. Fletcher, director G. Korotkov – Petruchio
 1999 — The Highway Crossing by J. Tätte, director J. Allik – Roland
 2000 — The Idiot by F.M. Dostoyevsky, director Y. Jerjomin – Prince Lev Nikolayevich Myshkin
 2000 — French Passion Near Moscow by L. Razumovskaja, director J. Nikolajev – Sergey Ivanovich
 2002 — The Storm by A. Ostrovsky – Kuligin
 2002 — Dates in June by A. Chekhov – Lomov
 2003 — The Phantom of Love by Pedro Calderon de la Barca – Don Manuel
 2003 — Toibele and her Devil by I. Bashevis Singer – Alhanon
 2003 — The Naked Truth (Le Libertin) by E.-E. Schmitt – Denis Diderot
 2005 — Happy Everyday! by J. Tätte, director R. Baskin – Fred
 2006 — The Russian Laughter after F. Dostoevsky, director R.Kozak – Semjon Semjonovich
 2007 — Dangerous Liaisons after Ch. de Laclos, director M. Tchumatchenko – Vikomte De Valmont
 2008 — The Dresser by R. Harwood, director R. Baskin – Norman
 2008 — Woe from Wit by A. Griboyedov, director Y. Jerjomnin – Alexandr Andreyevich Chatsky
 2009 — Don Juan by J-B. Molière, director M. Bychkov – Don Juan
 2010 — Frederick Or The Crime Boulevard by E.-E. Schmitt, director S. Morozov – Frédérick Lemaître
 2012 — One summer night in Sweden by E. Josephson, director I. Taska – Tarkovsky
 2012 — The Island of Polyn, after A. Yablonskaja "The Irons", director L. Manonina — Uncle Vanya (plays in Saint-Petersburg)
 2013 — Yes, Mr. Prime Minister by J. Lynn and A. Jay, director I.Taska – The ambassador of Kumranistan'''
 2014 - "Uncle Vanya" (A.Chekhov) ... Ivan VoinitskyCurrent repertoire:' 2011 — Five Evenings by A. Volodin, director A. Kladko – Iljin 2015 - Enemy based on the play Cosmetic of the Enemy author Amélie Nothomb, Jerome Anguest
 2016 - The Last Floor based on the play of Vladimir Zaikin, dir. V.Zaikin - “ Rebrov”

 Roles in cinema 
 1980 — A Name on the Snow - leading actor 1981 — The Last Cloud - leading actor 1981 — The Sweet Smell of Success“ – supporting actor 1991 - Nude in the Hat dir. Alexander Polynnikov.
 1992 — An Escape to the End of the World – leading actor 1993 — He'll get it hot – stunt man, stunt producer 2005–2006 — No other desires („Elagin Island“) – leading actor 2009 — Ivan the Terrible – Prince A. Kurbsky
 2009–2010 — Iron Lord (also titled as Yaroslav - A millennium ago) - leading actor 2012 — The Dragon Syndrome – Malyshev 2012 — Celestial Wives of the Meadow Mari – premiered at the Rome Film Festival
 2013 - On the Wings dir. Vlad Furman, the role of Kesh
 2015 - Another Life of Margarita dir. Anastasia Popova, (main role) Georgy Avercheko
 2015 - Adult Daughters dir. Andrew Eshpai, the role of Vladlen
 2015 - How I Became a Russian dir. Konstantin Statsky, the role of "Mr. Eccles"
 2015 - Sea Devils. Smerch 3 The Course of the Horse film number 25 directed by Alexandra Butko. Role Georgy Rud
 2016 - House on the edge of the forest - dir. Valery Rozhnov role Arkady Evgenievich
 2016 - Rustle -  Victor, head of real estate agency  2016 - Mirra - dir. Andree Troitsky
 2016 - “Winning“ short film dir. Vlad Muko, the film awarded a special prize on Film Festival in Bishkek in 2017
 2017 - Hotel Eleon -  Alexander Ivanovich is an oligarch, at whom Fedya worked as a chef-cook "(60th series)

Dance projects 
Founder and leader of Duff Tap Studio.
He has participated in various international dance projects in the U.S., Finland, Germany, Russia, Estonia, Bulgaria.
He has produced choreography for the Estonian production musical such as „Old Curiosity Shop“, „Chicago“, „Crazy for you“, „No, No, Nanette!“.
In 2005, 2006 and 2008 he has participated with his dance studio “Duff Tap” at the IDO World Tapdance Championships in Germany, Riesa, where they have won awards.
In 1995 – 2007, 2010 he organized, produced and directed annual show „Jazz & Tapp Show“ which is dedicated to International Tap Dance Day. In different years, musicians and dancers from the USA, Russia, Finland, Austria, France and even Japan have taken part in these annual concerts. Live jazz and the best dancers in the World perform during these concerts.

Awards 
 2000 — Named the best male drama actor in Estonia for the leading part in the play The Idiot. (Estonia)
 2001 — Prizewinner at the festival “Drama 2001”; was awarded the Iron Rose.
 2003 — Audience Choice Award in the season 2003/2004 in Russian Theater in Tallinn, Estonia
 2004 — Named the best male drama actor of the year in Russian Theater in Tallinn, Estonia
 2004 — Named the most professional teacher on the IV Republican Children’s and Youth Festival of Music Theaters.
 2011 — Nominated in the category "Best Actor" at the 19th International Film Festival and awarded as „Faithful and talented presentation“ for his role in the movie „Yaroslav.  A Milleinium ago". (Kostroma, Russia)
 2012 — Awarded as "Best Film Actor" for his role in the movie "Yaroslav. Thousand years ago" at the 20th International Children's Film Festival "Artek". (Artek, Crimea)
 2012 — Awarded a special prize for "Best choreographic work" for choreography "Libertango" by IV Youth Festival "Tap dance – 2012." (Yaroslavl, Russia)
 2013 — Received the fund "Blagovest" for roles in "Five Evenings" and "One summer night in Sweden."
 2014 - Awarded by the President of Estonia the Order of the "White Star" ,fifth degree, for special merits in the development of culture.
 2014 - Awarded with the Order "Peace and Friendship" of year 2014 by the Guild of Actors of Russian Cinema and Moscow Peace Foundation.

External links 
  (in English, Russian, Estonian)
 Official website of his photos
 Duff Tap Studio official homepage (in English, Russian, Estonian)
 Actor's page on the website of Russian Theater, Tallinn, Estonia (in English, Russian, Estonian)
 

1960 births
Living people
Male film actors from Georgia (country)
Actors from Tbilisi
Recipients of the Order of the White Star, 5th Class